"1nce Again" is a song by the hip-hop group A Tribe Called Quest, released as the first single from their fourth album Beats, Rhymes and Life.

Music video 
The music video, released in August 1996, begins with the group recreating the "Check the Rhime" video, with a crowd cheering. However, Phife notices that the police have come to arrest them, so the group runs into a dry cleaning store to hide. In the video, the group runs through different sections of the store while rapping. Tammy Lucas is also present in the store singing the chorus. At the end of the video, the police see the group running away up a flight of stairs. The group get onto the roof, at night, and they jump off the building as the video ends. Busta Rhymes makes an appearance in the music video.

Charts

Aphrodite remix

References

1996 singles
A Tribe Called Quest songs
Song recordings produced by J Dilla
Song recordings produced by the Ummah
Songs written by Q-Tip (musician)
Songs written by J Dilla
Songs written by Ali Shaheed Muhammad
1995 songs
Jive Records singles
Songs written by Phife Dawg